or simply Doreiku, is a Japanese novel series written by Shinichi Okada. A manga adaptation illustrated by Hiroto Ōishi ran for 10 volumes starting in 2012. A live action film was released under the title Tokyo Slaves in 2014, and an anime television series adaptation of the manga animated by Zero-G and TNK aired from April 13 to June 29, 2018.

Characters

A street smart girl who isn't afraid of speaking her mind out when it concerns the welfare of her friends. She is a tomboy who is quick-witted and can think fast on her feet when it comes to mind games and is not afraid of taking risk. She is always in the company of her dog Zushioumaru whom she doesn't know was once an experimental subject of Dr. Sumida who invented the "Slave Control Method" (SCM) which was intended to be used on animals such as dogs.

A college student who is also a hustler for finding ways to make money and other forms of excitement and adventures, he got involved in the SCM distribution with his partner in crime Shinnosuke Tachikawa, and has soon got on board with the slave trading game where he would gather up other SCM users and beat them in a game of wits with Eia as his accomplice and turn them into his own slaves. For a brief time he becomes Ryuuou's slave after being outwitted in a game, but later was freed when he was sent by the latter to duel an unknown SCM user who turned out to be Eia in disguise who later put on the SCM and has beaten him in a game.

A lonely girl who desired to be loved, her desire also makes her susceptible to being submissive and weak, she worked once as a club hostess whom initially had a relationship with Seiya but was later dumped and kicked out from his life by him after he becomes Ayaka's slave who ordered him to do so. She later becomes Ryuuou's nanny but unbeknownst to her that the latter had planned it from the beginning where she becomes his first slave after he tricked her into putting on the SCM. Though she is ryuuou slave, she does have feeling for him, whereby it is strongly suggested that even without being under the enslavement of the SCM she's be willing to do anything for him.

He is a male club host who a one point had a relationship with Julia, whom he later dumped after an obsessed Ayaka tricked him into putting on an SCM and becomes her slave, he later becomes Yuuga's slave after he and Ayaka were challenged by Yuuga into a game where he intentionally loses so as to get away from Ayaka's control and later becomes one of Ryuuou's slaves.

She is a club hostess with an eyepatch from another club that specializes in having their hostesses sport cutie attire. She is so obsessed with Seiya that she helps him be the number one host in his club but felt betrayed when she found out that he only used her for monetary purposes and he already had a relationship with a girl, Julia, angered by his betrayal and eager to break his relationship with Julia, he tricked him into putting on an SCM, but later her master and slave relationship ended when they encountered Yuuga and Eia who beat them in a game, where she together with Seiya becomes Yuuga's slave together with Seiya. They later become among Ryuuou's slaves.

Media

Novels
Shinichi Okada originally serialized the series as a web novel on the novel submission website Everystar before it was picked up for publication by Futabasha, who published it as three novels between 2013 and 2014. The main series was followed by a side story, and a sequel, both being released in 2014. A second sequel, has published four volumes since 2017.

Volumes
Dorei-ku: Boku to 23-nin no Dorei

Dorei-ku: Boku to 23-nin no Dorei.ex

Doreiku 2nd Shinjuku Kikō Kai

Dai Doreiku: Kimi to 1-Oku 3-Senban no Dorei

Manga
In 2012, Hiroto Ōishi launched a manga adaptation of the novels on Everystar, and Futabasha published the series in 10 collected tankōbon volumes. In October 2019, Takayoshi Kuroda launched a new manga adaptation, titled Doreiku - Gang Age, on Kakao Japan's Piccoma website that was serialized until October 2020.

Volumes

Doreiku

Doreiku - Gang Age

Live-action film

A live-action film starring Sayaka Akimoto and Kanata Hongō premiered in Japan in June 2014.

Anime
An anime television series adaptation of Ōishi's manga was announced on October 7, 2017. Ryōichi Kuraya directed and wrote the series, and animation was provided by Zero-G and TNK. Junji Goto provided character designs for the series as well as serving as chief animation director. The series aired from April 13 to June 29, 2018. It was broadcast on Tokyo MX and BS11. Netflix streamed the series in Japan. Sentai Filmworks licensed the series and simulcasted it on Hidive.

Reception
As of December 2017, the series had 3.2 million copies in print.

Notes

References

External links
  
  
 

2013 Japanese novels
2014 Japanese novels
2017 Japanese novels
Anime and manga based on novels
Fujimi Shobo manga
Futabasha manga
Japanese novels adapted into films
Japanese serial novels
Japanese webcomics
Medialink
Novels about slavery
Novels first published online
Psychological thriller anime and manga
Seinen manga
Sentai Filmworks
TNK (company)
Webcomics in print
Zero-G (studio)